Harpalus laevipes is a species of black coloured phytophagous ground beetle in the subfamily Harpalinae. It is found in Asia and is also common in North America.

Description

Habitat and ecology
It is found in gravelly moraines and shallow soils. It can also be found under stones, low herbal shrubs and limestone. The species is quite equipped to the mountainous lifestyle. It feeds on Calluna species.

References

External links
Harpalus laevipes on UK Beetles

laevipes
Beetles of Asia
Beetles of Europe
Beetles described in 1828